Hold (or Hauld) is a title of nobility, used in Viking Scandinavia and England.

History
Holds were described as "noblemen of exalted rank" in Viking Northumbria by Frank Stenton, with a wergild of 4000 thrymsas, equivalent to a king's high-reeve. Hold is described as a title just below the earl in Oxford Dictionary of Surnames.

References

External links

 Eystein Eggen 2005  (Norwegian, Aftenposten)
Noble titles
Norwegian nobility